The canton of Illiers-Combray is an administrative division of the Eure-et-Loir department, northern France. Its borders were modified at the French canton reorganisation which came into effect in March 2015. Its seat is in Illiers-Combray.

It consists of the following communes:
 
Bailleau-le-Pin
Billancelles
Blandainville
Cernay
Charonville
Les Châtelliers-Notre-Dame
Chauffours
Chuisnes
Courville-sur-Eure
Dangers
Épeautrolles
Ermenonville-la-Grande
Ermenonville-la-Petite
Le Favril
Fontaine-la-Guyon
Friaize
Fruncé
Illiers-Combray
Landelles
Luplanté
Magny
Marchéville
Méréglise
Meslay-le-Grenet
Mittainvilliers-Vérigny
Nogent-sur-Eure
Ollé
Orrouer
Pontgouin
Saint-Arnoult-des-Bois
Saint-Avit-les-Guespières
Saint-Denis-des-Puits
Saint-Éman
Saint-Georges-sur-Eure
Saint-Germain-le-Gaillard
Saint-Luperce
Sandarville
Le Thieulin
Vieuvicq
Villebon

References

Cantons of Eure-et-Loir